Gemmula diomedea, common name the albatross turrid, is a species of sea snail, a marine gastropod mollusk in the family Turridae, the turrids.

Taxonomy
According to Wilson, 1994 A.W.B. Powell, 1966 described it as a subspecies of Gemmula (Gemmula) congener diomedea but the two forms occur in the same areas and full species rank is accorded to Gemmula diomedea

Description
The length of the shell varies between 15 mm and 90 mm.

Distribution

References

 Abbott, R.T. & Dance S.P. (1982) Compendium of Seashells. E. P. Dutton Inc., New York, 411 pp
 Wilson, B. 1994. Australian marine shells. Prosobranch gastropods. Kallaroo, WA : Odyssey Publishing Vol. 2 370 pp
 Liu, J.Y. [Ruiyu] (ed.). (2008). Checklist of marine biota of China seas. China Science Press. 1267 pp.
 Li B. [Baoquan] & Li X. [Xinzheng]. (2008). Report on the turrid genera Gemmula, Lophiotoma and Ptychosyrinx (Gastropoda: Turridae: Turrinae) from the China seas. Zootaxa. 1778: 1-25.

External links
 Powell, A.W.B. 1964. The Family Turridae in the Indo-Pacific. Part 1. The Subfamily Turrinae. Indo-Pacific Mollusca 1: 227-346
  Tucker, J.K. 2004 Catalog of recent and fossil turrids (Mollusca: Gastropoda). Zootaxa 682:1-1295.

diomedea
Gastropods described in 1964